Dirichlet may refer to
 Peter Gustav Lejeune Dirichlet, a 19th-century German mathematician
 Dirichlet (crater), named after him
 11665 Dirichlet, a minor planet named after him

See also
List of things named after Peter Gustav Lejeune Dirichlet